Abacetus atroirideus is a species of ground beetle in the subfamily Pterostichinae. It was described by Straneo in 1959 and is found in Democratic Republic of the Congo, Ethiopia and Rwanda.

References

atroirideus
Beetles described in 1959
Insects of Central Africa
Insects of East Africa